Hebellidae is a family of hydrozoans.

Genera 
The following genera are recognized within the family Hebellidae:

 Anthohebella Boero, Bouillon & Kubota, 1997
 Bedotella Stechow, 1913
 Halisiphonia Allman, 1888
 Hebella Allman, 1888
 Scandia Fraser, 1912
 Staurodiscus Haeckel, 1879

References 

 
Leptothecata
Cnidarian families